"Clarity" is a 2008 single by Senakah.

Lyrically, the song discusses domestic violence.

References

2008 singles
Songs about domestic violence
2008 songs